Palmwag is a tourism concession on communal land in northern Namibia. It is located in the Kunene region, in northwestern Damaraland, halfway between Swakopmund and the Etosha National Park. It covers an area of 400,000 hectares and has populations of Hyphaena petersiana.

Wildlife in Palmwag includes leopards, lions, cheetahs, mountain zebras, Angolan giraffes, springboks, kudu, and African bush elephants. The reserve also has the largest population of south-western black rhinos in Africa; a local organization called Save the Rhino Trust protects them.

Palmwag is also a tourist attraction. The tourism concession was granted in 1986, Palmwag Lodge opened in that year. Today there is also the Palmwag Rhino Campo, a mobile tented camp managed by Rhino Trust which is intended to provide a base for rhino watching.

References 

Nature reserves in Namibia
Kunene Region